Skidmore is a census-designated place (CDP) in Bee County, Texas, United States. The population was 925 at the 2010 census.

Geography
Skidmore is located in southern Bee County at  (28.255244, -97.681956). U.S. Route 181 passes through the community, leading north  to Beeville, the county seat, and southeast  to Sinton. Texas State Highway 359 leads southwest  from Skidmore to Interstate 37 on the outskirts of Mathis.

Demographics
As of the census of 2000, there were 1,013 people, 348 households, and 258 families residing in the CDP. The population density was 96.4 people per square mile (37.2/km2). There were 427 housing units at an average density of 40.6/sq mi (15.7/km2). The racial makeup of the CDP was 82.82% White, 2.86% African American, 0.69% Native American, 0.59% Asian, 9.58% from other races, and 3.46% from two or more races. Hispanic or Latino of any race were 56.37% of the population.

There were 348 households, out of which 39.9% had children under the age of 18 living with them, 57.5% were married couples living together, 10.9% had a female householder with no husband present, and 25.6% were non-families. 21.6% of all households were made up of individuals, and 11.2% had someone living alone who was 65 years of age or older. The average household size was 2.90 and the average family size was 3.42.

In the CDP, the population was spread out, with 31.3% under the age of 18, 9.3% from 18 to 24, 27.1% from 25 to 44, 18.4% from 45 to 64, and 13.9% who were 65 years of age or older. The median age was 34 years. For every 100 females, there were 101.0 males. For every 100 females age 18 and over, there were 94.4 males.

The median income for a household in the CDP was $19,940, and the median income for a family was $25,833. Males had a median income of $23,056 versus $16,538 for females. The per capita income for the CDP was $8,864. About 25.6% of families and 31.7% of the population were below the poverty line, including 37.0% of those under age 18 and 33.0% of those age 65 or over.

Education
Skidmore and its neighboring community of Tynan are served by the Skidmore-Tynan Independent School District and home to the Skidmore-Tynan High School Bobcats.

References

External links
 Skidmore Signal
 Handbook of Texas Online article

Census-designated places in Bee County, Texas
Census-designated places in Texas